

Nonesuch may refer to:

Plants
 Lychnis chalcedonica, a wildflower
 Medicago lupulina, a wildflower

Places and structures
Nonesuch, Kentucky
Nonesuch Island, Bermuda
Nonesuch Mine, Michigan
Nonesuch Palace, mis-spelling of Nonsuch, English royal palace
Nonesuch River, Maine
Nonesuch River Golf Course, Maine

Other uses
Nonesuch Press, publisher in London 1922–1960s
Nonesuch Records, American record company
The Nonesuch, 1962 novel by Georgette Heyer

See also
Nonsuch (disambiguation)